The Thirty Years' War was one of the longest and most destructive conflicts in European history, lasting from 1618 to 1648. Fought primarily in Central Europe, an estimated 4.5 to 8 million soldiers and civilians died as a result of battle, famine, and disease, while some areas of what is now modern Germany experienced population declines of over 50%. Related conflicts include the Eighty Years' War, the War of the Mantuan Succession, the Franco-Spanish War, and the Portuguese Restoration War.

Until the 20th century, historians generally viewed the war as a continuation of the religious struggle initiated by the 16th-century Reformation within the Holy Roman Empire. The 1555 Peace of Augsburg attempted to resolve this by dividing the Empire into Lutheran and Catholic states, but over the next 50 years the expansion of Protestantism beyond these boundaries destabilised the settlement. While most modern commentators accept that differences over religion and Imperial authority were important factors in causing the war, they argue its scope and extent were driven by the contest for European dominance between Habsburg-ruled Spain and Austria, and the French House of Bourbon.

Its outbreak is generally traced to 1618, when Emperor Ferdinand II was deposed as king of Bohemia and replaced by the Protestant Frederick V of the Palatinate. Although Imperial forces quickly suppressed the Bohemian Revolt, his participation expanded the fighting into the Palatinate, whose strategic importance drew in the Dutch Republic and Spain, then engaged in the Eighty Years' War. Since rulers like Christian IV of Denmark and Gustavus Adolphus of Sweden also held territories within the Empire, this gave them and other foreign powers an excuse to intervene, turning an internal dynastic dispute into a broader European conflict.

The first phase from 1618 until 1635 was primarily a civil war between German members of the Holy Roman Empire, with support from external powers. After 1635, the Empire became one theatre in a wider struggle between France, supported by Sweden, and Emperor Ferdinand III, allied with Spain. This concluded with the 1648 Peace of Westphalia, whose provisions included greater autonomy within the Empire for states like Bavaria and Saxony, as well as acceptance of Dutch independence by Spain. By weakening the Habsburgs relative to France, the conflict altered the European balance of power and set the stage for the wars of Louis XIV.

Structural origins
The 1552 Peace of Passau sought to resolve the issues that led to conflict between Protestants and Catholics within the Holy Roman Empire, while the 1555 Peace of Augsburg tried to prevent their recurrence by fixing boundaries between the two faiths. Under the principle of cuius regio, eius religio, states were categorised as either Lutheran, then the most usual form of Protestantism, or Catholic, based on the religion of their ruler. Other provisions protected substantial religious minorities in cities like Donauwörth and confirmed Lutheran ownership of property taken from the Catholic Church since Passau.

These agreements were undermined by the post-1555 expansion of Protestantism into areas previously designated as Catholic, as well as the growth of Reformed faiths not recognised by Augsburg, especially Calvinism, a theology viewed with hostility by both Lutherans and Catholics. The Peace of Augsburg also gave individual rulers within the Empire greater political autonomy and control over the religion practised in their domains, while weakening central authority. Conflict over economic and political objectives frequently superseded religion, with Lutheran Saxony, Denmark-Norway and Sweden  competing with each other and Calvinist Brandenburg over the Baltic trade.

Reconciling these differences was hampered by the fragmented nature of the Empire and its representative institutions, which included 300 Imperial Estates distributed across Germany, the Low Countries, Northern Italy and modern France. They ranged in size and importance from the seven Prince-electors who voted for the Holy Roman Emperor, down to Prince-bishoprics and Imperial cities like Hamburg. Each also belonged to a regional grouping or "Imperial circle", which primarily focused on defence and operated as autonomous bodies. Above them sat the Imperial Diet, which prior to 1663 assembled on an irregular basis and largely served as a forum for discussion, rather than legislation. 

Although Emperors were elected, since 1440 the position had been held by a member of the House of Habsburg, the largest single landowner in the Holy Roman Empire with territories containing over eight million subjects, including Austria, Bohemia and Hungary. They also ruled Spain until 1556 when the two empires were divided, although Spain retained Imperial states such as Milan and Franche-Comté. While the Austrian and Spanish Habsburgs often worked together, their objectives did not always align. The Spanish Empire was a global maritime superpower whose possessions included the Spanish Netherlands, Milan, the Kingdom of Naples, the Philippines, and much of the Americas. In contrast, Austria was a land-based power, focused on ensuring their pre-eminence within Germany and securing their eastern border against the Ottoman Empire.

Before Augsburg, unity of religion compensated for lack of strong central authority; once removed, it presented opportunities for those who sought to further weaken it. These included ambitious Imperial states like Lutheran Saxony and Catholic Bavaria, as well as France, confronted by Habsburg lands on its borders to the North, South, and along the Pyrenees. Since many foreign rulers were also Imperial princes, divisions within the Empire drew in external powers like Christian IV of Denmark, who joined the war in 1625 as Duke of Holstein-Gottorp.

Background: 1556 to 1618

Disputes occasionally resulted in full-scale conflict like the 1583 to 1588 Cologne War, caused when its ruler converted to Calvinism. More common were events such as the 1606 'Battle of the Flags' in Donauwörth, when riots broke out after the Lutheran majority blocked a Catholic religious procession. Emperor Rudolf approved intervention by the Catholic Maximilian of Bavaria. In return, he was allowed to annex the town and as agreed at Augsburg, the official religion changed from Lutheran to Catholic.

When the Imperial Diet opened in February 1608, both Lutherans and Calvinists united to demand formal re-confirmation of the Augsburg settlement. However, in return the Habsburg heir Archduke Ferdinand required the immediate restoration of all property taken from the Catholic church since 1555, rather than the previous practice whereby the court ruled case by case. This threatened all Protestants, paralysed the Diet, and removed the perception of Imperial neutrality.

Loss of faith in central authority meant towns and rulers began strengthening their fortifications and armies; outside travellers often commented on the growing militarisation of Germany in this period. This was taken a stage further in 1608 when Frederick IV, Elector Palatine formed the Protestant Union and Maximilian responded by setting up the Catholic League in July 1609. Both structures were primarily designed to support the dynastic ambitions of their leaders, but their creation combined with the 1609 to 1614 War of the Jülich Succession to increase tensions throughout the Empire. Some historians who see the war as primarily a European conflict argue Jülich marks its beginning, with Spain and Austria backing the Catholic candidate, France and the Dutch Republic the Protestant.

External powers became involved in what was an internal German dispute due to the imminent expiry of the 1609 Twelve Years' Truce, which suspended the Eighty Years' War between Spain and the Dutch Republic. Before restarting hostilities, Ambrosio Spinola, commander in the Spanish Netherlands, needed to secure the Spanish Road, an overland route connecting Habsburg possessions in Italy to Flanders. This allowed him to move troops and supplies by road, rather than sea where the Dutch navy was dominant; by 1618, the only part not controlled by Spain ran through the Electoral Palatinate.

Since Emperor Matthias had no surviving children, in July 1617 Philip III of Spain agreed to support Ferdinand's election as king of Bohemia and Hungary. In return, Ferdinand made concessions to Spain in Northern Italy and Alsace, and agreed to support their offensive against the Dutch. Delivering these commitments required his election as Emperor, which was not guaranteed; one alternative was Maximilian of Bavaria, who opposed the increase of Spanish influence in an area he considered his own, and tried to create a coalition with Saxony and the Palatinate to support his candidacy.

A third candidate was the Calvinist Frederick V, Elector Palatine, who succeeded his father in 1610, then in 1613 married Elizabeth Stuart, daughter of James I of England. Four of the electors were Catholic, three Protestant; if this could be changed, it might result in a Protestant Emperor. When Ferdinand was elected king of Bohemia in 1617, he gained control of its electoral vote; however, his conservative Catholicism made him unpopular with the largely Protestant nobility, who were also concerned at the erosion of their rights. In May 1618, these factors combined to bring about the Bohemian Revolt.

Phase I: 1618 to 1635

The Bohemian Revolt

Ferdinand once claimed he would rather see his lands destroyed than tolerate heresy, and within 18 months of taking control of Styria in 1595, he had eliminated Protestantism in what was previously a stronghold of the Reformation. Absorbed by their war in the Netherlands, his Spanish relatives preferred to avoid antagonising Protestants elsewhere. They recognised the dangers associated with Ferdinand's fervent Catholicism, but supported his claim due to the lack of alternatives.

Ferdinand reconfirmed Protestant religious freedoms when elected king of Bohemia in May 1617, but his record in Styria led to the suspicion he was only awaiting a chance to overturn them. These concerns were exacerbated when a series of legal disputes over property were all decided in favour of the Catholic Church. In May 1618, Protestant nobles led by Count Thurn met in Prague Castle with Ferdinand's two Catholic representatives, Vilem Slavata and Jaroslav Borzita. In what became known as the Third Defenestration of Prague, both men were thrown out of the castle windows along with their secretary Filip Fabricius, although all three survived.

Thurn established a Protestant-dominated government in Bohemia, while unrest expanded into Silesia and the Habsburg heartlands of Lower and Upper Austria, where much of the nobility was also Protestant. Losing control of these threatened the entire Habsburg state, while Bohemia was one of the most prosperous areas of the Empire and its electoral vote crucial to ensuring Ferdinand succeeded Matthias as Emperor. The combination meant their recapture was vital for the Austrian Habsburgs but chronic financial weakness left them dependent on Maximilian and Spain for the resources needed to achieve this.

Spanish involvement inevitably drew in the Dutch, and potentially France, although the strongly Catholic Louis XIII of France faced his own Protestant rebels at home and refused to support them elsewhere. The revolt also provided opportunities for external opponents of the Habsburgs, including the Ottoman Empire and Savoy. Funded by Frederick and Charles Emmanuel I, Duke of Savoy, a mercenary army under Ernst von Mansfeld was sent to support the Bohemian rebels. Attempts by Maximilian and John George of Saxony to broker a negotiated solution ended when Matthias died in March 1619, since many believed the loss of his authority and influence had fatally damaged the Habsburgs.

By mid-June 1619, the Bohemian army under Thurn was outside Vienna and although Mansfeld's defeat by Imperial forces at Sablat forced him to return to Prague, Ferdinand's position continued to worsen. Gabriel Bethlen, Calvinist Prince of Transylvania, invaded Hungary with Ottoman support, although the Habsburgs persuaded them to avoid direct involvement; this was helped when the Ottomans became involved in the 1620 Polish war, followed by the 1623 to 1639 conflict with Persia.

On 19 August, the Bohemian Estates rescinded Ferdinand's 1617 election as king; on the 26th, they formally offered the crown to Frederick. Two days later, Ferdinand was elected Emperor, making war inevitable if Frederick accepted the Bohemian crown. Most of Frederick's advisors urged him to reject it, as did the Duke of Savoy, and his father-in-law James I. The exceptions included Christian of Anhalt and Maurice of Orange, for whom conflict in Germany was a means to divert Spanish resources from the Netherlands. The Dutch offered subsidies to Frederick and the Protestant Union, helped raise loans for Bohemia, and provided weapons and munitions. 

However, wider European support failed to materialise, largely due to lack of enthusiasm for removing a legally elected ruler, regardless of religion. Although Frederick accepted the crown and entered Prague in October 1619, his support eroded over the next few months. In July 1620, the Protestant Union proclaimed its neutrality, while John George of Saxony backed Ferdinand in return for the cession of Lusatia, and a guarantee of Lutheran rights in Bohemia. Maximilian of Bavaria funded a combined Imperial-Catholic League army led by Count Tilly and Charles of Bucquoy, which pacified Upper and Lower Austria and occupied western Bohemia before marching on Prague. The Bohemians were defeated by Tilly at the White Mountain in November 1620; demoralised by shortages and disease, the rebel army disintegrated and Frederick fled Bohemia.

The Palatinate Campaign
By abandoning Frederick, the German princes hoped to restrict the dispute to Bohemia, but Maximilian's dynastic ambitions made this impossible. In the October 1619 Treaty of Munich, Ferdinand agreed to transfer the Palatinate's electoral vote to Bavaria and allow him to annex the Upper Palatinate. Many Protestants supported Ferdinand because they objected to deposing the legally elected king of Bohemia, and now opposed Frederick's removal on the same grounds. Doing so turned the conflict into a contest between Imperial authority and "German liberties", while Catholics saw an opportunity to regain lands lost since 1555. The combination destabilised large parts of the Empire.

The strategic importance of the Palatinate and its proximity to the Spanish Road drew in external powers; in August 1620, the Spanish under Spinola and Córdoba occupied the Lower Palatinate. James I of England responded to this attack on his son-in-law by sending naval forces to threaten Spanish possessions in the Americas and the Mediterranean, and announced he would declare war if Spinola had not withdrawn his troops by spring 1621. These actions were primarily designed to placate his opponents in Parliament, who considered his pro-Spanish policy a betrayal of the Protestant cause. However, Spanish chief minister Olivares correctly interpreted them as an invitation to open negotiations, and in return for an Anglo-Spanish alliance offered to restore Frederick to his Rhineland possessions.

Since Frederick's demand for full restitution of his lands and titles was incompatible with the Treaty of Munich, hopes of reaching a negotiated peace quickly evaporated. Despite defeat in Bohemia, Frederick's allies included Georg Friedrich of Baden and Christian of Brunswick, while the Dutch provided him with military support after the Eighty Years War restarted in April 1621 and his father-in-law James funded an army of mercenaries under Mansfeld. However, their failure to co-ordinate effectively led to a series of defeats by Spanish and Catholic League forces, including Wimpfen in May 1622 and Höchst in June. By November 1622, the Imperialists controlled most of the Palatinate, apart from Frankenthal, which was held by a small English garrison under Sir Horace Vere. The remnants of Mansfeld's army took refuge in the Dutch Republic, as did Frederick, who spent most of his time in The Hague until his death in November 1632.

At a meeting of the Imperial Diet in February 1623, Ferdinand forced through provisions transferring Frederick's titles, lands, and electoral vote to Maximilian. He did so with support from the Catholic League, despite strong opposition from Protestant members, as well as the Spanish. The Palatinate was clearly lost; in March, James instructed Vere to surrender Frankenthal, while Tilly's victory over Christian of Brunswick at Stadtlohn in August completed military operations. However, Spanish and Dutch involvement in the campaign was a significant step in internationalising the war, while Frederick's removal meant other Protestant princes began discussing armed resistance to preserve their own rights and territories.

Danish intervention (1625–1629) 

With Saxony dominating the Upper Saxon Circle and Brandenburg the Lower, both kreise had remained neutral during the campaigns in Bohemia and the Palatinate. However, Frederick's deposition in 1623 meant John George of Saxony and the Calvinist George William, Elector of Brandenburg became concerned Ferdinand intended to reclaim formerly Catholic bishoprics currently held by Protestants. These fears seemed confirmed when Tilly restored the Roman Catholic Diocese of Halberstadt in early 1625.

As Duke of Holstein, Christian IV was also a member of the Lower Saxon circle, while the Danish economy relied on the Baltic trade and tolls from traffic through the Øresund. In 1621, Hamburg accepted Danish 'supervision', while his son Frederick became joint-administrator of Lübeck, Bremen, and Verden; possession ensured Danish control of the Elbe and Weser rivers.

Ferdinand had paid Albrecht von Wallenstein for his support against Frederick with estates confiscated from the Bohemian rebels, and now contracted with him to conquer the north on a similar basis. In May 1625, the Lower Saxony kreis elected Christian their military commander, although not without resistance; Saxony and Brandenburg viewed Denmark and Sweden as competitors, and wanted to avoid either becoming involved in the Empire. Attempts to negotiate a peaceful solution failed as the conflict in Germany became part of the wider struggle between France and their Habsburg rivals in Spain and Austria.

In the June 1624 Treaty of Compiègne, France had agreed to subsidise the Dutch war against Spain for a minimum of three years, while in the December 1625 Treaty of The Hague, the Dutch and English agreed to finance Danish intervention in the Empire. Hoping to create a wider coalition against Ferdinand, the Dutch invited France, Sweden, Savoy, and the Republic of Venice to join, but it was overtaken by events. In early 1626, Cardinal Richelieu, main architect of the alliance, faced a new Huguenot rebellion at home and in the March Treaty of Monzón, France withdrew from Northern Italy, re-opening the Spanish Road.

Dutch and English subsidies enabled Christian to devise an ambitious three part campaign plan; while he led the main force down the Weser, Mansfeld would attack Wallenstein in Magdeburg, supported by forces led by Christian of Brunswick and Maurice of Hesse-Kassel. The advance quickly fell apart; Mansfeld was defeated at Dessau Bridge in April, and when Maurice refused to support him, Christian of Brunswick fell back on Wolfenbüttel, where he died of disease shortly after. The Danes were comprehensively beaten at Lutter in August, and Mansfeld's army dissolved following his death in November.

Many of Christian's German allies, such as Hesse-Kassel and Saxony, had little interest in replacing Imperial domination for Danish, while few of the subsidies agreed in the Treaty of the Hague were ever paid. Charles I of England allowed Christian to recruit up to 9,000 Scottish mercenaries, but they took time to arrive, and while able to slow Wallenstein's advance were insufficient to stop him. By the end of 1627, Wallenstein occupied Mecklenburg, Pomerania, and Jutland, and began making plans to construct a fleet capable of challenging Danish control of the Baltic. He was supported by Spain, for whom it provided an opportunity to open another front against the Dutch.

On 13 May 1628, his deputy von Arnim besieged Stralsund, the only port with large enough shipbuilding facilities, but this brought Sweden into the war. King Gustavus Adolphus despatched several thousand Scots and Swedish troops to Stralsund, commanded by Alexander Leslie who was also appointed governor. Von Arnim was forced to lift the siege on 4 August, but three weeks later, Christian suffered another defeat at Wolgast. He began negotiations with Wallenstein, who despite his recent victories was concerned by the prospect of Swedish intervention, and thus anxious to make peace.

With Austrian resources stretched by the outbreak of the War of the Mantuan Succession, Wallenstein persuaded Ferdinand to agree to relatively lenient terms in the June 1629 Treaty of Lübeck. Christian retained his German possessions of Schleswig and Holstein, in return for relinquishing Bremen and Verden, and abandoning support for the German Protestants. While Denmark kept Schleswig and Holstein until 1864, this effectively ended its reign as the predominant Nordic state.

Once again, the methods used to obtain victory explain why the war failed to end. Ferdinand paid Wallenstein by letting him confiscate estates, extort ransoms from towns, and allowing his men to plunder the lands they passed through, regardless of whether they belonged to allies or opponents. Anger at such tactics and his growing power came to a head in early 1628 when Ferdinand deposed the hereditary Duke of Mecklenburg, and appointed Wallenstein in his place. Although opposition to this act united all German princes regardless of religion, Maximilian of Bavaria was compromised by his acquisition of the Palatinate; while Protestants wanted Frederick restored and the position returned to that of 1618, the Catholic League argued only for pre-1627.

Made overconfident by success, in March 1629 Ferdinand passed an Edict of Restitution, which required all lands taken from the Catholic church after 1555 to be returned. While technically legal, politically it was extremely unwise, since doing so would alter nearly every single state boundary in North and Central Germany, deny the existence of Calvinism and restore Catholicism in areas where it had not been a significant presence for nearly a century. Well aware none of the princes involved would agree, Ferdinand used the device of an Imperial edict, once again asserting his right to alter laws without consultation. This new assault on 'German liberties' ensured continuing opposition and undermined his previous success.

In the Spanish Netherlands the balance of power had by now shifted in favour of the Dutch Republic. The financial predicament of the Spanish Crown had steadily worsened in the 1620s and the sensational success of the fleet of the Dutch West India Company, under Piet Hein, which captured the Spanish treasure convoy off the Cuban coast, at Matanzas, in 1628, further depressed Spain's fortunes, while it encouraged the Dutch. The war over the Mantuan Succession also acted as a massive diversion and took up much of the Spanish recources which would otherwise have been committed to the Netherlands. In 1629, 's-Hertogenbosch, one of the best fortified cities in Europe, was captured by the Dutch States Army, under Frederick Henry, Prince of Orange, despite Spanish and Imperial attempts to save the city. This was a shattering blow to Spanish prestige, which caused deep dismay in Madrid and represented the first large scale Spanish defeat in Europe since the scattering of the Armada of 1588.

Swedish intervention; 1630 to 1634

Gustavus spent the period from 1626 to 1629 fighting against Poland–Lithuania, which was ruled by his Catholic cousin Sigismund, who also claimed the Swedish throne and had Imperial support. With only a few minor states like Hesse-Kassel still openly opposing the Emperor, Gustavus became an obvious ally for Richelieu. In September 1629, the latter helped negotiate the Truce of Altmark between Sweden and Poland, freeing Gustavus to enter the war. Partly a genuine desire to support his Protestant co-religionists, like Christian he also wanted to maximise his share of the Baltic trade that provided much of Sweden's income.

Following failed negotiations with the Emperor, Gustavus landed in Pomerania in June 1630 with nearly 18,000 Swedish troops. Using Stralsund as a bridgehead, he marched south along the Oder towards Stettin and coerced Bogislaw XIV, Duke of Pomerania, into agreeing an alliance which secured his interests in Pomerania against his rival Sigismund. As a result, the Poles turned their attention to Russia, initiating the 1632 to 1634 Smolensk War.

However, Swedish expectations of widespread German support proved unrealistic. By the end of 1630, their only new ally was the Administrator of Magdeburg, Christian William whose capital was under siege by Tilly. Despite the devastation inflicted by Imperial soldiers, Saxony and Brandenburg had their own ambitions in Pomerania, which clashed with those of Gustavus; previous experience also showed inviting external powers into the Empire was easier than getting them to leave.

Gustavus put pressure on Brandenburg by sacking Küstrin and Frankfurt an der Oder, while the Sack of Magdeburg in May provided a powerful warning of the potential consequences of Imperial victory. Once again, Richelieu used French financial power to bridge differences between the Swedes and the German princes; the 1631 Treaty of Bärwalde provided funds for the Swedes and their Protestant allies, including Saxony and Brandenburg. These amounted to 400,000 Reichstaler per year, or one million livres, plus an additional 120,000 for 1630. While the payments were less than 2% of total French income, they boosted that of Sweden by more than 25%, and allowed Gustavus to support an army of 36,000.

Gustavus used this army to win victories at Breitenfeld in September 1631, then Rain in April 1632, where Tilly was killed. Ferdinand turned once again to Wallenstein, who realised Gustavus was overextended and established himself at Fürth, from where he could threaten his supply lines. The largest battle of the war took place in late August, when an assault on the Imperial camp outside the town was bloodily repulsed, arguably the greatest blunder committed by Gustavus during his German campaign.

Two months later, the Swedes and Imperials met at Lützen, where both sides suffered heavy casualties; Gustavus himself was killed, while some Swedish units incurred losses of over 60%. Fighting continued until dusk when Wallenstein retreated, abandoning his artillery and wounded. Despite their losses, this allowed the Swedes to claim victory, although the result continues to be disputed.

Following the death of Gustavus, Swedish policy was directed by his extremely capable Chancellor Axel Oxenstierna; in April 1633, the Swedes and their German allies formed the Heilbronn League with funding provided by the French and in July their combined forces defeated an Imperial army led by the Bavarian general Bronckhorst-Gronsfeld at Oldendorf. Wallenstein's reputation had been severely damaged by Lützen, while critics claimed he had failed to adequately support the Bavarians. Combined with rumours he was preparing to switch sides, Emperor Ferdinand ordered his arrest in February 1634; on 25th, he was assassinated by his own officers in Cheb.

The loss of Wallenstein and his organisation left Emperor Ferdinand reliant on Spain for military support, whose main concern was to re-open the Spanish Road for their campaign against the Dutch. This meant the focus of the war now shifted to the Rhineland and Bavaria. Cardinal-Infante Ferdinand of Austria, newly appointed Governor of the Spanish Netherlands, raised an army of 18,000 in Italy, which met up with an Imperial force of 15,000 at Donauwörth on 2 September 1634. Three days later, they won a decisive victory at Nördlingen which destroyed Swedish power in Southern Germany and led to the defection of their German allies, who now sought to make peace with the Emperor.

Phase II: French intervention from 1635 to 1648

By triggering direct French intervention, Nördlingen expanded the conflict rather than ending it. Richelieu provided the Swedes with new subsidies, hired mercenaries led by Bernard of Saxe-Weimar for an offensive in the Rhineland and in May 1635 formally declared war on Spain. A few days later, the German states and Ferdinand agreed the Peace of Prague; in return for withdrawing the Edict of Restitution, the Heilbronn and Catholic Leagues were dissolved and replaced by a single Imperial army, although Saxony and Bavaria retained control of their own forces. This is generally seen as the point when the war ceased to be a primarily inter-German religious conflict.

In March 1635, French soldiers entered the Valtellina, cutting the link between Spanish controlled Milan and the Empire. In May, their main army of 35,000 invaded the Spanish Netherlands, but withdrew in July after suffering 17,000 casualties. The Spanish responded in 1636 with an offensive that reached Corbie in Northern France, causing panic in Paris before they had to retreat. In March 1636, France joined the war in support of Sweden, whose loss of most of the territories gained by Gustavus and their taxes made it increasingly reliant on French financing. Although most of their German allies defected following the Peace of Prague, the Swedes under Johan Banér defeated an Imperial force at Wittstock on 4 October, re-establishing their predominance in North-East Germany.

Ferdinand II died in February 1637 and was succeeded by his son Ferdinand III, who faced a deteriorating military position. Although Matthias Gallas and the main Imperial army had forced Banér back to the Baltic, in March 1638, Bernard destroyed an Imperial army at Rheinfelden. His capture of Breisach in December secured French control of Alsace and severed the Spanish Road, forcing Gallas to divert resources there. Although von Hatzfeldt defeated a combined Swedish-German force at Vlotho in October, Gallas withdrew from the Baltic due to lack of supplies, while his army partially dissolved in the process.

In April 1639, Banér defeated the Saxons at Chemnitz, then entered Bohemia in May. To retrieve the situation, Ferdinand diverted Piccolomini's army from Thionville, ending direct military cooperation between Austria and Spain. This increased pressure grew on Spanish minister Olivares to make peace, especially after attempts to hire Polish auxiliaries proved unsuccessful. Cutting the Spanish Road forced Madrid to resupply their armies in Flanders by sea and in October 1639 a large Spanish convoy was destroyed at the Battle of the Downs by a Dutch fleet, led by Maarten Tromp.

Elsewhere, Dutch attacks on Portuguese colonies caused unrest in Portugal, then part of the Spanish Empire. Combined with heavy taxes, in 1640 this caused revolts first in Portugal, then Catalonia. After the French captured Arras in August 1640 and overran Artois, Olivares argued Spain should accept Dutch independence and focus on retaining Flanders. At the same time, the Dutch peace party had been strengthened in 1637 when Frederick Henry recaptured Breda. Convinced the war was won and the only question was the price of peace, in 1640 the regenten who dominated Dutch politics reduced the army budget, despite objections from Frederick Henry.

After Bernard died in July 1639, his troops joined Banér's Swedish army on an ineffectual campaign along the Weser, the highlight being a surprise attack in January 1641 on the Imperial Diet in Regensburg. Forced to retreat, Banér reached Halberstadt in May where he died, and despite beating off an Imperial force at Wolfenbüttel in June, his largely German troops mutinied due to lack of pay. The situation was saved by the arrival of Lennart Torstenson in November with 7,000 Swedish recruits and enough cash to satisfy the mutineers.

French victory at Kempen in January 1642 was followed by Second Breitenfeld in October 1642, where Torstenson inflicted almost 10,000 casualties on an Imperial army led by Archduke Leopold Wilhelm of Austria. The capture of Leipzig in December gave the Swedes a significant new base in Germany, and despite their failure to take Freiberg, by 1643 the Saxon army had been reduced to a few isolated garrisons. While Ferdinand accepted a military solution was no longer possible, by fighting on he hoped to prevent the Imperial Estates joining his peace negotiations with France and Sweden, thus preserving his authority by allowing him to represent the Empire as a whole.

This seemed more likely when Richelieu died in December 1642, followed by Louis XIII in May 1643, leaving his five-year-old son Louis XIV as king. However, Richelieu's policies were continued by his successor Cardinal Mazarin, while French gains in Alsace allowed him to re-focus on the war against Spain in the Netherlands. On 19 May, Condé won an emphatic victory over the Spanish at Rocroi, though this was less significant than often assumed. It had no effect on control of the Southern Netherlands, and the Spanish veterans taken prisoner were quickly exchanged. However, in the long term it ended any prospect of invading France from the Low Countries.

Condé's inability to take full advantage of Rocroi was partially due to factors that affected all the combatants. The devastation inflicted by 25 years of warfare meant armies spent more time foraging than fighting, forcing them to become smaller and more mobile with a much greater emphasis on cavalry. It also shortened the campaigning seasons, since the need to gather forage meant they started later, and restricted them to areas that could be easily supplied, usually close to rivers. In addition, the French had to rebuild their army in Germany after it was shattered by an Imperial-Bavarian force led by Franz von Mercy at Tuttlingen in November.

Soon after Rocroi, Ferdinand invited Sweden and France to attend peace talks in the Westphalian towns of Münster and Osnabrück, but these were delayed when Christian of Denmark blockaded Hamburg and increased toll payments in the Baltic. This severely impacted the Dutch and Swedish economies and in December 1643 the Swedes began the Torstenson War by invading Jutland, with the Dutch providing naval support. Ferdinand pulled together an Imperial army under Gallas to attack the Swedes from the rear, which proved a disastrous decision. Leaving Wrangel to finish the war in Denmark, in May 1644 Torstenson marched into the Empire; Gallas was unable to stop him, while the Danes sued for peace after their defeat at Fehmarn in October 1644.

In August 1644, the French and Bavarian armies met in the three day Battle of Freiburg, in which both sides suffered heavy casualties but is generally viewed as a narrow Bavarian victory. His losses convinced Maximilian the war could no longer be won and he now put pressure on Ferdinand to end the conflict. Shortly after peace talks restarted in November, Gallas' Imperial army disintegrated and the remnants retreated into Bohemia, where they were scattered by Torstenson at Jankau in March 1645. In May, a Bavarian force under von Mercy destroyed a French detachment at Herbsthausen, before he was defeated and killed at Second Nördlingen in August. With Ferdinand unable to help, John George of Saxony signed a six-month truce with Sweden in September, followed by the March 1646 Treaty of Eulenberg in which he agreed to remain neutral until the end of the war.

Under Turenne, French commander in the Rhineland, and Wrangel, who had replaced Torstenson, the French and Swedes separately invaded Bavaria in the summer of 1646. Maximilian was soon desperate to end the war he was largely responsible for starting, at which point the Spanish  publicised a secret offer by Mazarin to exchange French-occupied Catalonia for the Spanish Netherlands. Angered by this duplicity, the Dutch agreed a truce with Spain in January 1647 and began to negotiate their own peace terms. Having failed to acquire the Netherlands through diplomacy, Mazarin decided to do so by force and to free up resources, on 14 March 1647 he signed the Truce of Ulm with Bavaria, Cologne and Sweden.

The offensive was to be led by Turenne, but the plan fell apart when his mostly German troops mutinied, while Bavarian general Johann von Werth refused to comply with the truce. Although the mutinies were quickly suppressed, Maximilian felt obliged to follow Werth's example and in September ordered Bronckhorst-Gronsfeld to combine the remnants of the Bavarian army with Imperial troops under von Holzappel. Outnumbered by a Franco-Swedish army led by Wrangel and Turenne, they were defeated at Zusmarshausen in May 1648 and von Holzappel was killed. Although the bulk of the Imperial army escaped thanks to an effective rearguard action by Raimondo Montecuccoli, Bavaria was left defenceless once again.

The Swedes sent a second force under von Königsmarck to attack Prague, seizing the castle and Malá Strana district in July. The main objective was to gain as much loot as possible before the war ended; they failed to take the Old Town but captured the Imperial library, along with treasures including the Codex Gigas, now in Stockholm. When a Spanish offensive in Flanders ended with defeat at Lens in August 1648, Ferdinand finally agreed terms and on 24 October, he signed peace treaties with France and Sweden, ending the war.

The conflict outside Germany

Northern Italy

Parts of northern Italy, which were part of the Kingdom of Italy, had been contested by France and the Habsburgs since the end of the 15th century, as it was vital for control of south-west France, an area with a long history of opposition to the central authorities. While Spain remained the dominant power in Lombardy and in Southern Italy, its reliance on long exterior lines of communication was a potential weakness. This applied particularly to the Spanish Road, which allowed them to safely move recruits and supplies from the Kingdom of Naples through Lombardy to their army in Flanders. The French sought to disrupt the Road by attacking the Spanish-held Duchy of Milan or blocking the Alpine passes through alliances with the Grisons.

Montferrat and its fortress of Casale Monferrato were subsidiary territories of the Duchy of Mantua and their possession allowed the holder to threaten Milan. This meant when the last duke in the direct line died in December 1627, France and Spain backed rival claimants, resulting in the 1628 to 1631 War of the Mantuan Succession. The French-born Duke of Nevers was backed by France and the Republic of Venice, his rival the Duke of Guastalla by Spain, Ferdinand II, Savoy and Tuscany. While a relatively minor conflict, the struggle had a disproportionate impact on the Thirty Years War, since Pope Urban VIII viewed Habsburg expansion in Italy as a threat to the Papal States. The result was to divide the Catholic church, alienate the Pope from Ferdinand II and make it acceptable for France to employ Protestant allies against him.

In March 1629, the French stormed Savoyard positions in the Pas de Suse, lifted the Spanish siege of Casale and captured Pinerolo. The Treaty of Suza then ceded the two fortresses to France and allowed their troops unrestricted passage through Savoyard territory, giving them control over Piedmont and the Alpine passes into Southern France. However, as soon as the main French army withdrew in late 1629, the Spanish and Savoyards besieged Casale once again, while Ferdinand II provided German mercenaries to support a Spanish offensive which routed the main Venetian field army and forced Nevers to abandon Mantua. By October 1630, the French position seemed so precarious their representatives agreed the Treaty of Ratisbon but since the terms effectively destroyed Richelieu's policy of opposing Habsburg expansion, it was never ratified.

Several factors restored the French position in Northern Italy, notably a devastating outbreak of plague; between 1629 and 1631, over 60,000 died in Milan and 46,000 in Venice, with proportionate losses elsewhere. Richelieu took advantage of the diversion of Imperial resources from Germany to fund a Swedish invasion, whose success forced the Spanish-Savoyard alliance to withdraw from Casale and sign the Treaty of Cherasco in April 1631. Nevers was confirmed as Duke of Mantua and although Richelieu's representative, Cardinal Mazarin, agreed to evacuate Pinerolo, it was later secretly returned under an agreement with Victor Amadeus I, Duke of Savoy. With the exception of the 1639 to 1642 Piedmontese Civil War, this secured the French position in Northern Italy for the next twenty years.

After the outbreak of the Franco-Spanish War in 1635, Richelieu supported a renewed offensive by Victor Amadeus against Milan to tie down Spanish resources. These included an unsuccessful attack on Valenza in 1635, plus minor victories at Tornavento and Mombaldone. However, the anti-Habsburg alliance in Northern Italy fell apart when first Charles of Mantua died in September 1637, then Victor Amadeus in October, whose death led to a struggle for control of the Savoyard state between his widow Christine of France and brothers, Thomas and Maurice.

In 1639, their quarrel erupted into open warfare, with France backing Christine and Spain the two brothers, and resulted in the Siege of Turin. One of the most famous military events of the 17th century, at one stage it featured no less than three different armies besieging each other. However, the revolts in Portugal and Catalonia forced the Spanish to cease operations in Italy and the war was settled on terms favourable to Christine and France.

In 1647, a French-backed rebellion succeeded in temporarily overthrowing Spanish rule in Naples. The Spanish quickly crushed the insurrection and restored their rule over all of southern Italy, defeating multiple French expeditionary forces sent to back the rebels. However, it exposed the weakness of Spanish rule in Italy and the alienation of the local elites from Madrid; in 1650, the governor of Milan wrote that as well as widespread dissatisfaction in the south, the only one of the Italian states that could be relied on was the Duchy of Parma.

Catalonia

Throughout the 1630s, tax increases levied to pay for the war led to protests throughout Spanish territories, which in 1640 resulted in simultaneous revolts first in Portugal, then the Principality of Catalonia. Backed by France as part of Richelieu's 'war by diversion', in January 1641 the rebels proclaimed a Catalan Republic. The Madrid government quickly assembled an army of 26,000 men to crush the revolt, which defeated the rebels at Martorell on 23 January 1641. The French now persuaded the Catalan Courts to recognise Louis XIII as Count of Barcelona, and ruler of Catalonia.

On 26 January, a combined French-Catalan force routed a larger Spanish army at Montjuïc and secured Barcelona. However, the rebels soon found the new French administration differed little from the old, turning the war into a three-sided contest between the Franco-Catalan elite, the rural peasantry, and the Spanish. There was little serious fighting after France took control of Perpignan and Roussillon, establishing the modern Franco-Spanish border in the Pyrenees. The revolt ended in 1651 with the Spanish capture of Barcelona.

Outside Europe 

In 1580, Philip II of Spain also became ruler of the Portuguese Empire, creating the Iberian Union; long-standing commercial rivals, the 1602 to 1663 Dutch–Portuguese War was an offshoot of the Dutch fight for independence from Spain. The Portuguese dominated the trans-Atlantic economy known as the Triangular trade, in which slaves were transported from West Africa and Portuguese Angola to work on plantations in Portuguese Brazil, which exported sugar and tobacco to Europe. Known by Dutch historians as the 'Great Design", control of this trade would not only be extremely profitable but also deprive the Spanish of funds needed to finance their war in the Netherlands.

The Dutch West India Company was formed in 1621 to achieve this purpose and a Dutch fleet captured the Brazilian port of Salvador, Bahia in 1624. After it was retaken by the Portuguese in 1625, a second fleet established Dutch Brazil in 1630, which was not returned until 1654. The second part was seizing slave trading hubs in Africa, chiefly Angola and São Tomé; supported by the Kingdom of Kongo, whose position was threatened by Portuguese expansion, the Dutch successfully occupied both in 1641.

Spain's inability or unwillingness to provide protection against these attacks increased Portuguese resentment and were major factors in the outbreak of the Portuguese Restoration War in 1640. Although ultimately expelled from Brazil, Angola and São Tomé, the Dutch retained the Cape of Good Hope, as well as Portuguese trading posts in Malacca, the Malabar Coast, the Moluccas and Ceylon.

Peace of Westphalia (1648) 

The Peace of Westphalia actually consisted of three separate agreements; the Peace of Münster between Spain and the Dutch Republic, the Treaty of Osnabrück between the Empire and Sweden, plus the Treaty of Münster between the Empire and France. Preliminary discussions began in 1642 but only became serious in 1646; a total of 109 delegations attended at one time or other, with talks split between Münster and Osnabrück. After the Swedes rejected Christian of Denmark as mediator, the negotiators finally agreed on Papal Legate Fabio Chigi and the Venetian envoy Alvise Contarini.

The Peace of Münster was the first to be signed on 30 January 1648 and is considered to be part of the Westphalia settlement since the Dutch Republic was still technically part of the Spanish Netherlands and thus Imperial territory. The treaty confirmed Dutch independence, although the Imperial Diet did not formally accept that it was no longer part of the Empire until 1728. The Dutch were also given a monopoly over trade conducted through the Scheldt estuary, ensuring the commercial ascendancy of Amsterdam; Antwerp, capital of the Spanish Netherlands and previously the most important port in Northern Europe, would not recover until the late 19th century.

Negotiations with France and Sweden were conducted in conjunction with the Imperial Diet, and were multi-sided discussions involving many of the German states. This resulted in the treaties of Münster and Osnabrück, making peace with France and Sweden respectively. Ferdinand resisted signing until the last possible moment, doing so on 24 October only after a crushing French victory over Spain at Lens, and with Swedish troops on the verge of taking Prague. It has been argued they were a "major turning point in German and European...legal history", because they went beyond normal peace settlements and effected major constitutional and religious changes to the Empire itself.

Key elements of the Peace were provisions confirming the autonomy of states within the Empire, including Ferdinand's acceptance of the supremacy of the Imperial Diet, and those seeking to prevent future religious conflict. Article 5 reconfirmed the Augsburg settlement, established 1624 as the basis, or "Normaljahr", for determining the dominant religion of a state and guaranteed freedom of worship for religious minorities. Article 7 recognised Calvinism as a Reformed faith and removed the ius reformandi, the requirement that if a ruler changed his religion, his subjects had to follow suit. These terms did not apply to the hereditary lands of the Habsburg monarchy, such as Lower and Upper Austria.

In terms of territorial concessions, Brandenburg-Prussia received Farther Pomerania, and the bishoprics of Magdeburg, Halberstadt, Kammin, and Minden. Frederick's son Charles Louis regained the Lower Palatinate and became the eighth Imperial elector, although Bavaria kept the Upper Palatinate and its electoral vote. Externally, the treaties formally acknowledged the independence of the Dutch Republic and the Swiss Confederacy, effectively autonomous since 1499. In Lorraine, the Three Bishoprics of Metz, Toul and Verdun, occupied by France since 1552, were formally ceded, as were the cities of the Décapole in Alsace, with the exception of Strasbourg and Mulhouse. Sweden received an indemnity of five million thalers, the Imperial territories of Swedish Pomerania, and the Prince-bishoprics of Bremen and Verden, which also gave them a seat in the Imperial Diet.

The Peace was later denounced by Pope Innocent X, who regarded the bishoprics ceded to France and Brandenburg as property of the Catholic church, and thus his to assign. It also disappointed many exiles by accepting Catholicism as the dominant religion in Bohemia, Upper and Lower Austria, all of which were Protestant strongholds prior to 1618. Fighting did not end immediately, since demobilising over 200,000 soldiers was a complex business, and the last Swedish garrison did not leave Germany until 1654. In addition, Mazarin insisted on excluding the Burgundian Circle from the treaty of Münster, allowing France to continue its campaign against Spain in the Low Countries, a war that continued until the 1659 Treaty of the Pyrenees. The political disintegration of Poland-Lithuania led to the 1655 to 1660 Second Northern War with Sweden, which also involved Denmark, Russia and Brandenburg, while two Swedish attempts to impose its control on the port of Bremen failed in 1654 and 1666.

It has been argued the Peace established the principle known as Westphalian sovereignty, the idea of non-interference in domestic affairs by outside powers, although this has since been challenged. The process, or 'Congress' model, was adopted for negotiations at Aix-la-Chapelle in 1668, Nijmegen in 1678, and Ryswick in 1697; unlike the 19th century 'Congress' system, these were to end wars, rather than prevent them, so references to the 'balance of power' can be misleading.

Human and financial cost of the war 

Historians often refer to the 'General Crisis' of the mid-17th century, a period of sustained conflict in states such as China, the British Isles, Tsarist Russia and the Holy Roman Empire. In all these areas, war, famine and disease inflicted severe losses on local populations. While the Thirty Years' War certainly ranks as one of the worst of these events, 19th century nationalists often increased or exaggerated its impact to illustrate the dangers of a divided Germany. Suggestions of up to 12 million deaths from a population of 18 million are no longer accepted, while claims of material losses are either not supported by contemporary evidence or in some cases exceed prewar tax records.

The conflict has been described as one of the greatest medical catastrophes in history but by modern standards the number of soldiers involved was relatively low. Battles generally featured armies of around 13,000 to 20,000 each, the largest being Alte Veste in 1632 with a combined 70,000 to 85,000. Estimates of the total deployed by both sides within Germany range from an average of 80,000 to 100,000 from 1618 to 1626, peaking at 250,000 in 1632 and falling to under 160,000 by 1648. Casualty rates could be extremely high; of 230 men conscripted from the Swedish village of Bygdeå between 1621 and 1639, 215 are recorded as dead or missing, while another five returned home crippled.

Aggregating figures from known battles and sieges, historian Peter Wilson estimates those either killed or wounded in combat totalled around 450,000. Since research shows disease either killed or incapacitated two to three times that number, that would suggest military casualties ranged from 1.3 to 1.8 million dead or otherwise rendered unfit for service. Pitirim Sorokin calculates an upper limit of 2,071,000 military casualties, although his methodology has been disputed. In general, historians agree the war was an unprecedented mortality disaster and the vast majority of casualties, whether civilian or military, took place after Swedish intervention in 1630.

Based on local records, military action accounted for less than 3% of civilian deaths, with the major causes being starvation (12%), bubonic plague (64%), typhus (4%), and dysentery (5%). Although regular outbreaks of disease were common for decades prior to 1618, the conflict greatly accelerated their spread, due to the influx of soldiers from foreign countries, the shifting locations of battle fronts and displacement of rural populations into already crowded cities. This was not restricted to Germany; disease carried by French and Imperial soldiers allegedly sparked the 1629–1631 Italian plague. Described as the "worst mortality crisis to affect Italy during the Early modern period", it resulted in some 280,000 deaths, with higher estimates of around 1 million. Poor harvests throughout the 1630s and repeated plundering of the same areas led to widespread famine; contemporaries record people eating grass, or too weak to accept alms, while instances of cannibalism were common.

The modern consensus is the population of the Holy Roman Empire declined from 18 to 20 million in 1600 to 11 to 13 million in 1650, and did not regain pre-war levels until 1750. Nearly 50% of these losses appear to have been incurred during the first period of Swedish intervention from 1630 to 1635. The high mortality rate compared to the Wars of the Three Kingdoms in Britain may partly be due to the reliance of all sides on foreign mercenaries, often unpaid and required to live off the land. Lack of a sense of 'shared community' resulted in atrocities such as the destruction of Magdeburg, in turn creating large numbers of refugees who were extremely susceptible to sickness and hunger. While flight saved lives in the short-term, in the long run it often proved catastrophic.

In 1940, agrarian historian Günther Franz published a detailed analysis of regional data from across Germany covering the period from 1618 to 1648. Broadly confirmed by more recent work, he concluded "about 40% of the rural population fell victim to the war and epidemics; in the cities,...33%". These figures can be misleading, since Franz calculated the absolute decline in pre and post-war populations, or 'total demographic loss'. They therefore include factors unrelated to death or disease, such as permanent migration to areas outside the Empire or lower birthrates, a common but less obvious impact of extended warfare. There were also wide regional variations; some areas in Northwest Germany were relatively peaceful after 1630 and experienced almost no population loss, while those of Mecklenburg, Pomerania and Württemberg fell by nearly 50%.

Although some towns may have overstated their losses to avoid taxes, individual records confirm serious declines; from 1620 to 1650, the population of Munich fell from 22,000 to 17,000, that of Augsburg from 48,000 to 21,000. The financial impact is less clear; while the war caused short-term economic dislocation, especially in the period 1618 to 1623, overall it accelerated existing changes in trading patterns. It does not appear to have reversed ongoing macro-economic trends, such as the reduction of price differentials between regional markets, and a greater degree of market integration across Europe. The death toll may have improved living standards for the survivors; one study shows wages in Germany increased by 40% in real terms between 1603 and 1652.

Military developments

Innovations made during the war by Gustavus in particular are considered part of the tactical evolution known as the "Military Revolution", although there is some debate as to whether tactics or technology were at the heart of these changes. These developments were popularised by Maurice of Orange in the 1590s and sought to increase infantry firepower by moving from massed columns to line formation. Gustavus refined these changes by reducing the ten ranks used by Maurice to six, while increasing the proportion of Musketeers to pikemen; in addition, each unit was equipped with quick-firing light artillery pieces on either flank. Perhaps the best example of their application in real life was the defeat of Tilly's traditionally organised army by the Swedes at Breitenfeld in September 1631.

Line formations were not always successful, as demonstrated by the victory of the supposedly obsolete Spanish tercios over the "new model" Swedish army at Nördlingen in 1634. They were also harder to co-ordinate in offensive operations; Gustavus compensated by requiring his cavalry to be far more aggressive, often employing his Finnish light cavalry or Hakkapeliitta as shock troops. He also used columns on occasion, including the failed assault at Alte Veste in September 1632. Columns continued to be viewed as more effective in offensive operations and were used by Napoleon throughout the latter stages of the Napoleonic Wars.

Such tactics needed professional soldiers, who could retain formation, reload and fire disciplined salvos while under attack, as well as the use of standardised weapons. The first half of the 17th century saw the publication of numerous instruction manuals showing the movements required, thirty-two for pikemen and forty-two for musketeers. The period needed to train an infantryman who could operate in this way was estimated as six months, although in reality many went into battle with far less experience. It also placed greater responsibility on junior officers who provided the vital links between senior commanders and the tactical unit. One of the first military schools designed to produce such men was set up at Siegen in 1616 and others soon followed.

On the other hand, strategic thinking failed to develop at the same pace. Historian Jeremy Black claims most campaigns were "inconclusive" and almost exclusively concerned with control of territory, rather than focused strategic objectives. The lack of connection between military and diplomatic goals helps explain why the war lasted so long and why peace proved so elusive. There were a number of reasons for this. When the Treaty of Westphalia was signed in 1648, the Franco-Swedish alliance still had over 84,000 men under arms on Imperial territory, their opponents around 77,000; while relatively small in modern terms, such numbers were unprecedented at the time. With the possible exception of Spain, the 17th century state could not support armies of this size, forcing them to depend on "contributions" levied or extorted from areas they passed through.

Obtaining supplies thus became the limiting factor in campaign planning, an issue that grew more acute later in the war when much of the Empire had already been fought over. Even when adequate provisions could be gathered, the next problem was getting them to the troops; to ensure security of supply, commanders were forced to stay close to rivers, then the primary means of bulk transportation, and could not move too far from their main bases. Many historians argue feeding the troops became an objective in itself, unconnected to diplomatic goals and largely uncontrolled by their central governments. The result was "armies increasingly devoid of intelligible political objectives...degenerating into travelling armed mobs living in a symbiotic relationship with the countryside they passed through". This lack of connection often worked against the political aims of their employers; the devastation inflicted in 1628 and 1629 by Imperial troops on Brandenburg and Saxony, both nominally their allies, was a major factor in their support for Swedish intervention.

Social and cultural impact 

It has been suggested the breakdown of social order caused by the war was often more significant and longer lasting than the immediate damage. The collapse of local government created landless peasants, who banded together to protect themselves from the soldiers of both sides, and led to widespread rebellions in Upper Austria, Bavaria and Brandenburg. Soldiers devastated one area before moving on, leaving large tracts of land empty of people and changing the ecosystem. Food shortages were worsened by an explosion in the rodent population, while Bavaria was overrun by wolves in the winter of 1638, and its crops destroyed by packs of wild pigs the following spring.

Contemporaries spoke of a 'frenzy of despair' as people sought to make sense of the relentless and often random bloodshed unleashed by the war. Attributed by religious authorities to divine retribution for sin, attempts to identify a supernatural cause led to a series of Witch-hunts, beginning in Franconia in 1626 and quickly spreading to other parts of Germany. They began in the Bishopric of Würzburg, an area with a history of such events going back to 1616 and now re-ignited by Bishop von Ehrenberg, a devout Catholic eager to assert the church's authority in his territories. By the time he died in 1631, over 900 people from all levels of society had been executed.

The Bamberg witch trials, held in the nearby Bishopric of Bamberg from 1626 to 1631, claimed over one thousand lives; in 1629, 274 died in the Eichstätt witch trials, plus another 50 in the adjacent Duchy of Palatinate-Neuburg. Elsewhere, persecution followed Imperial military success, expanding into Baden and the Palatinate following their reconquest by Tilly, then into the Rhineland. However, the extent to which they were symptomatic of the impact of the conflict on society is debatable, since many took place in areas relatively untouched by the war. Concerned their brutality would discredit the Counter-Reformation, Ferdinand ensured active persecution largely ended by 1630.

Although the war caused immense destruction, it has also been credited with sparking a revival in German literature, including the creation of societies dedicated to "purging of foreign elements" from the German language. One example is Simplicius Simplicissimus, often suggested as one of the earliest examples of the Picaresque novel; written by Hans Jakob Christoffel von Grimmelshausen in 1668, it includes a realistic portrayal of a soldier's life based on his own experiences, many of which are verified by other sources. Other less famous examples include the diaries of Peter Hagendorf, a participant in the Sack of Magdeburg whose descriptions of the everyday brutalities of the war remain compelling.

For German, and to a lesser extent Czech writers, the war was remembered as a defining moment of national trauma, the 18th century poet and playwright Friedrich Schiller being one of many to use it in their work. Variously known as the 'Great German War,' 'Great War' or 'Great Schism', for 19th and early 20th century German nationalists it showed the dangers of a divided Germany and was used to justify the creation of the German Empire in 1871, as well as the Greater Germanic Reich envisaged by the Nazis. Bertolt Brecht used it as the backdrop for his 1939 anti-war play Mother Courage and Her Children, while its enduring cultural resonance is illustrated by the novel Tyll; written by Austro-German author Daniel Kehlmann and also set during the war, it was nominated for the 2020 Booker Prize.

Political consequences 

The Peace reconfirmed "German liberties", ending Habsburg attempts to convert the Holy Roman Empire into a more centralised state similar to Spain. Over the next 50 years, Bavaria, Brandenburg-Prussia, Saxony and others increasingly pursued their own policies, while Sweden gained a permanent foothold in the Empire. Despite these setbacks, the Habsburg lands suffered less from the war than many others and became a far more coherent bloc with the absorption of Bohemia, and restoration of Catholicism throughout their territories.

By laying the foundations of the modern nation state, Westphalia changed the relationship between subjects and their rulers. Previously, many had overlapping, sometimes conflicting, political and religious allegiances; they were now understood to be subject first and foremost to the laws and edicts of their respective state authority, not the claims of any other entity, religious or secular. This made it easier to levy national forces of significant size, loyal to their state and its leader; one lesson learned from Wallenstein and the Swedish invasion was the need for their own permanent armies, and Germany as a whole became a far more militarised society.

For Sweden, the benefits of Westphalia ultimately proved short-lived. Unlike French gains which were incorporated into France, Swedish territories remained part of the Empire, and they became members of the Lower and Upper Saxon kreis. While this gave them seats in the Imperial Diet, it also brought them into direct conflict with both Brandenburg-Prussia and Saxony, their competitors in Pomerania. The income from their imperial possessions remained in Germany and did not benefit the kingdom of Sweden; although they retained parts of Swedish Pomerania until 1815, much of it was ceded to Prussia in 1679 and 1720.

France arguably gained more from the Thirty Years' War than any other power; by 1648, most of Richelieu's objectives had been achieved. These included separation of the Spanish and Austrian Habsburgs, expansion of the French frontier into the Empire, and an end to Spanish military supremacy in Northern Europe. Although the Franco-Spanish conflict continued until 1659, Westphalia allowed Louis XIV to begin replacing Spain as the predominant European power.

While differences over religion remained an issue throughout the 17th century, it was the last major war in Continental Europe in which it can be said to be a primary driver; later conflicts were either internal, such as the Camisards revolt in South-Western France, or relatively minor like the 1712 Toggenburg War. It created the outlines of a Europe that persisted until 1815 and beyond; the nation-state of France, the beginnings of a unified Germany and separate Austro-Hungarian bloc, a diminished but still significant Spain, independent smaller states like Denmark, Sweden and Switzerland, along with a Low Countries split between the Dutch Republic and what became Belgium in 1830.

Involvement

Notes

References

Sources

 
 
 
 
 
 
 
 
 
 
 
 
 
 
 
 
 
 
 
 
 
 
 
 
 
 
 
 
 
 
 
 
 
 
 
 
 
 
 
 
 
 
 
 
 
 
 
 
 
 
  (with several contributors)

Further reading

 
 
 
 
 
 
 
 
 
 
 
 
 
 
 
 
  in 2 vols; translation by William Blaquiere. 
 
 
 

 
17th-century conflicts
17th-century Christianity
17th century in Europe
17th century in the Habsburg monarchy
17th-century military history of the Kingdom of England
17th century in Bohemia
17th century in the Dutch Republic
17th century in France
17th century in the Holy Roman Empire
17th century in the Spanish Empire
17th century in Switzerland
Christianity in the Holy Roman Empire
European wars of religion
Habsburg Bohemia
History of Central Europe
History of the Palatinate (region)
Principality of Transylvania (1570–1711)
Warfare of the Early Modern period
Wars involving England
Wars involving France
Wars involving Germany
Wars involving the Habsburg monarchy
Wars involving the Holy Roman Empire